The Abbey of Our Lady of Montserrat, or Manila Abbey, is a Benedictine men's monastery located on Mendiola Street in Manila, the Philippines. The monastery was founded by monks from Spain in 1895, in the final years of Spanish colonial era in the Philippines and is dedicated to Our Lady of Montserrat.

The resident monks, which belong to the Philippine Pro-Province of the Subiaco Cassinese Congregation (a part of the Benedictine Confederation) also operate San Beda University on the abbey's grounds.

History

Origins
In the 19th century, several anti-clerical governments in Spain took measures to suppress the many monasteries there. If they were not closed outright, communities were forbidden by the state to accept new candidates, with the goal of letting monastic communities die out. With time however, exceptions were made for monasteries which would operate in the far-flung regions still a part of Spain's once mighty empire, primarily the Philippines.

As a result of this incentive, the ancient Benedictine Abbey of Our Lady of Monserrat near Barcelona made the decision to establish a mission foundation in the area of Manila. The plan was for the community to follow the agrarian way of life which was part of the reform then under way by the recently formed Subiaco Congregation (forerunner of the present congregation) and provide pastoral care of the local population. On September 12, 1895, eight choir monks and six laybrothers, under the leadership of Dom José Deas y Villar, O.S.B., arrived in Manila. After being hosted by the local Jesuit community, the monks obtained property for themselves in Surigao, which they occupied on April 25 of the following year.

American period
The American occupation of the Philippines in 1898, in the course of the Spanish–American War, changed the new monastery's situation dramatically. Loss of financial support from the Spanish crown for the Catholic missions in the country left the community in desperate straits. Given that, and a desire on the part of the abbot of the community to counteract the new influence of Protestant missionaries, who had arrived under the protection of the American government, the monks decided to turn to education as their focus. On June 17, 1901, they opened San Beda College, named after the great English Benedictine scholar and saint, the Venerable Bede, on Arlegui Street. The curriculum consisted of elementary, secondary and initial university studies, with graduates awarded either a Bachelor of Arts degree or a diploma in business. The college was accredited and affiliated by and to the Pontifical University of Santo Tomas in 1906.

By that time, the monastery grounds had become too small for the monks and the college, so the monks purchased land on Mendiola Street. In 1909, they entrusted the pastoral care of the region to Missionaries of the Sacred Heart from the Netherlands and moved to their current location, which they expanded in 1918. The cornerstone of the abbey church was laid on February 15, 1925, and it was completed and consecrated on January 13, 1926, to the Infant of Prague.

It was built in a Neogothic exterior, with a Neo-baroque interior painted by Dom Lesmes López, a Spaniard, and Brother Salvador Alberich. The pair worked on the abbey church from 1931 to 1939, leaving only the back wall of the nave above the entrance blank. Dom Lesmes López's paintings on the vaulted ceiling of the nave include the 16 allegories on the virtues, theology and the Church. "The Apotheosis of the Holy Name of Jesus" were painted over the sanctuary, while on its walls are eight panels on the Nativity of the Lord. Paintings of the Stations of the Cross are also seen within the interior of the church.

Present condition
By 1971, the monastic community had gone from a high point of some 100 monks to a membership of thirty.

In 2010, Rev Aelred Nilo, designed the final mural to fill the back wall of the nave, which was then executed by the Italian painter Francesco Giannini on 126 square metres of jute canvas. The mural depicts the history of the present congregation, as well as the Resurrected Christ, saints, and various other religious figures, some based on real-life photographs.

National Historical Commission marker
The marker of Abbey of Our Lady of Montserrat Manila was installed in 1939 at San Beda College, Mendiola, Manila.  It was installed by the Philippines Historical Committee (now the National Historical Commission of the Philippines).

List of abbots
The abbey has been led by eight abbots throughout its history.

 Rt. Rev. Raimundo Salinas,  (1925–1939)
 Rt. Rev. Pedro Celestino Gusi,  (1947–1957) — Elected Abbot President of the Subiaco Congregation
 Rt. Rev. Wilfrido Rojo,  (1958–1962)
 Rt. Rev. Bernardo Lopez,  (1962–1968)
 Rt. Rev. Eduardo Africa,  (1980–1986) — First Filipino abbot
 Rt. Rev. Andres Formilleza,  (1989–1998)
 Rt. Rev. Tarcisio Narciso,  (2001–2013)
 Rt. Rev. Austin Cadiz,  (2018–present)

Gallery

References

See also
San Beda University

19th-century Christian monasteries
Benedictine monasteries in the Philippines
Buildings and structures in San Miguel, Manila
Cultural Properties of the Philippines in Metro Manila
Religious organizations established in 1895
Roman Catholic churches in Manila
20th-century Roman Catholic church buildings in the Philippines
1895 establishments in the Philippines
19th-century Roman Catholic church buildings in the Philippines